UDBC may refer to:

Open Database Connectivity
United Districts Basketball Club
Ural Drum&Bass Community